A hoodie (also spelled hoody) is a type of jacket with a hood.

Hoodie or hoody may also refer to:
 "Hoodie" (Lady Sovereign song), from the album Public Warning
 "Hoodie" (Omarion song), from the album Ollusion
 An abbreviation for "hoodiecrow", the hooded crow, a bird
 Hoodie Allen, American hip-hop artist
 an alternative term for chav, a stereotype used in Britain
 Hoodie (software), open-source Javascript package, that enables offline first, Front-end web development
 Hoody (singer) (born 1990), South Korean singer-songwriter

See also 
 The Tale of the Hoodie, a Scottish fairy tale involving a hooded crow
 Hu Die (actress), a Chinese actress